Dax Eric López (born 1975) is a former Georgia state Judge and is a former nominee to be a United States district judge of the United States District Court for the Northern District of Georgia.

Biography

Judge López received his Bachelor of Science from Vanderbilt University in 1998 and his Juris Doctor from Vanderbilt Law School in 2001. He began his legal career by serving as a law clerk to the Honorable Héctor Laffitte, Chief Judge of the United States District Court for the District of Puerto Rico, from 2001 to 2002. From 2005 to 2008, he worked at the law firm of Ashe, Rafuse & Hill, LLP (now Polsinelli PC), from 2002 to 2005, he worked at Holland & Knight, worked as an attorney at Foltz Martin LLC (now dissolved) in Atlanta, Georgia from 2008 to 2010. Since 2010, has served as a judge on the State Court of Dekalb County where he presides over both civil and criminal matters. He is a member of the Federalist Society.

On September 2, 2021, Lopez resigned from the court to join the law firm of DelCampo and Grayson in Dunwoody, Georgia.

Expired nomination to district court

On July 30, 2015, President Barack Obama nominated López to serve as a United States District Judge of the United States District Court for the Northern District of Georgia, to the seat vacated by Judge Julie E. Carnes, who was elevated to the United States Court of Appeals for the Eleventh Circuit. Georgia Senator David Perdue announced that he would not return a blue slip, effectively killing his nomination. His nomination expired on January 3, 2017, with the end of the 114th Congress.

References

1975 births
Living people
21st-century American lawyers
Attorneys from Ponce
Federalist Society members
Georgia (U.S. state) state court judges
Puerto Rican lawyers
Vanderbilt University alumni
Vanderbilt University Law School alumni